Sidecar Health is an American health insurance company headquartered in El Segundo, California.  The company offers insurance plans serving the large group, ACA and IFP markets in 18 states.

History 
Sidecar Health was founded in El Segundo, California in 2018 by Patrick Quigley and Veronica Osetinsky. The pair were previously executives at Katch (formerly Vantage Media), an online advertising technology company and customer acquisition marketplace for insurers.

The company launched its first insurance product in 2019 in Texas, as the state's large uninsured population offered a sizable potential customer base. By the end of the year, Sidecar Health had expanded to Alabama, Arkansas, Florida, Georgia, Kentucky, and North Carolina.

Sidecar Health initially raised $18 million in funding through venture capital firms GreatPoint Ventures and Morpheus Ventures. In July 2020, it raised $20 million in a new round of funding that included Comcast Ventures, Kauffman Fellows, and 23andMe CEO Anne Wojcicki. It closed its Series C funding round in January 2021, led by Drive Capital, at $125 million—bringing it to a $1 billion valuation, often referred to as unicorn status. Funding supported staffing and further expansion, along with investment in new insurance products. As of 2022, the company operates in 18 states: Alabama, Arkansas, Arizona, Florida, Georgia, Illinois, Indiana, Kentucky, Maryland, Michigan, Mississippi, Ohio, Oklahoma, North Carolina, South Carolina, Tennessee, Texas, and Utah.

Services 
Sidecar Health offers plans for multiple markets, including employer sponsored, ACA and IFP. All Sidecar Health insurance products are built on users paying providers for care directly at the point of service. The website and mobile app provides members their benefit amounts, and offers local market data including prices and reviews among local providers. The company provides members with a Sidecar Health VISA debit card to pay for services. Such cash payments are often lower than negotiated rates with insurance companies according to academic studies. Upon payment, the company pays its share as determined by its reimbursement schedule, and any remaining amount is charged to the user's account. For example, the company reimburses $153 for a visit to an OBGYN.

In 2022, Sidecar Health launched Affordable Care Act plans in the state of Ohio, and a fully-insured employer-sponsored product in Ohio.  In addition, it continues to market its Access Plan, which is an excepted benefit plan under the ACA in 18 states and is underwritten by partner insurers.  A Brookings Institution report suggested that excepted benefits products like its Access Plan may undermine risk pooling.

References 

American companies established in 2017
Financial services companies established in 2017
Health insurance companies of the United States